The canton of Roanne-2 is an administrative division of the Loire department, in eastern France. It was created at the French canton reorganisation which came into effect in March 2015. Its seat is in Roanne.

It consists of the following communes: 
Riorges
Roanne (partly)
Saint-Léger-sur-Roanne
Villerest

References

Cantons of Loire (department)